eMovie is a plug-in for PyMOL that makes the creation of molecular movies both easy and intuitive via a breakthrough storyboard interface, similar in nature to what is used in the creation of traditional movies.

eMovie is a user-friendly way for users to create movies in PyMOL (even inexperienced users).  Users interact with a user-friendly eMovie GUI that does not require typing commands into PyMOL.

Modular actions such as zooms, rotations, fadings, and morphs (morphs require incentive PyMOL) can be inserted to any frame in the movie and the actions comprising the movie can be reviewed in list-format by viewing the eMovie storyboard.  The storyboard also allows for deletion and reinsertion of actions. Movies can be saved, loaded, and exported as a series of image files to be later merged into a traditional movie format such as .mov using an external program like GraphicConverter.

eMovie was created at the Israel Structural Proteomics Center (ISPC) at the Weizmann Institute of Science, and is freely available for download at the eMovie homepage. As of 31 July 2016, that page is 404

References

Further reading
 E. Hodis, G. Schreiber, K. Rother and J.L. Sussman (2007). "eMovie: a storyboard-based tool for making molecular movies". In: Trends in Biochemical Sciences 32, 199–204.

Molecular modelling software
Data visualization software
Bioinformatics software